Wick C. Haxton (born August 21, 1949, in Santa Cruz, California) is an American theoretical nuclear physicist and astrophysicist.

Haxton grew up in Santa Cruz, studied from 1967 at the University of California, Santa Cruz (BA in Physics and Mathematics 1971) and received his doctorate in 1976 at Stanford University (Semileptonic weak interactions). From 1975 to 1977 he worked at the Institute for Nuclear Physics of the University of Mainz and then until 1984 as Oppenheimer Fellow in the Theoretical Division of the Los Alamos National Laboratory. After a year as assistant professor at Purdue University in 1984 he became associate professor and in 1987 professor at the University of Washington. He remained there as professor of physics and astronomy until 2009, serving from 1991 to 2006 as director of the National Institute for Nuclear Theory (INT). In 2009 he left the University of Washington to become professor of physics at the University of California, Berkeley and Senior Faculty Scientist at Lawrence Berkeley National Laboratory.

Haxton is engaged in nuclear astrophysics (supernovae, the solar neutrino problem, nucleosynthesis), neutrino physics (neutrino oscillations, neutrinoless double beta decay, neutrino properties), many-body theory (effective theories) in nuclear physics (as well as in atomic physics and condensed matter physics), and tests of symmetries of fundamental interactions ( parity, CP-symmetry, lepton number).  He led the early efforts to convert the Homestake Mine in South Dakota to scientific use as the Deep Underground Science and Engineering Laboratory, but left the project after the mine was flooded in 2003. He has been a consultant for Los Alamos National Laboratory, Lawrence Livermore National Laboratory, Argonne National Laboratory, Brookhaven National Laboratory,  TRIUMF, Oak Ridge National Laboratory, and various other laboratories and university facilities over the past two decades.

He is a Fellow of the American Physical Society (1987), and in the 1990s served as chair of the Division of Nuclear Physics and the Division of Astrophysics. He is a member of the National Academy of Sciences (1999),  and a Fellow of the American Academy of Arts and Sciences, the American Association for the Advancement of Science (1988), and the Washington State Academy of Sciences. He was a Guggenheim Fellow (2000–2001), Miller Fellow at Berkeley (2001), Bethe Lecturer at Cornell University (2001) and received the 2004 Hans Bethe Prize of the American Physical Society for his contributions and scientific leadership in neutrino astrophysics and especially for the connection of nuclear physics theory with experiments and observations in nuclear astrophysics and astrophysics (eulogy).

External links 
 Homepage at the University of Washington
 Eulogy to the Bethe Prize
 Page at the University of Berkeley
 Homepage in Berkeley
 Biography at the APS

1949 births
Living people
People from Santa Cruz, California
University of California, Santa Cruz alumni
Stanford University alumni
University of Washington faculty
University of California, Berkeley faculty
Los Alamos National Laboratory personnel
Members of the United States National Academy of Sciences
21st-century American physicists
Fellows of the American Physical Society